Agassizilia is an extinct genus of pycnodont fishes from the mid-Cretaceous (Albian-Cenomanian) Kem Kem Group in south-east Morocco. The genus contains a single species, A. erfoudina. It was described from an isolated prearticular bone (lower jaw) with a unique tooth arrangement on its dental pavement which differentiates it from all other known pycnodont genera. It is the first new genus of pycnodont fish to be found in the Moroccan Kem Kem Group. Although the rest of its skeleton is unknown, the pavement of blunt delicate teeth on the holotype suggests that it fed of soft shelled invertebrates such as shrimp or ostracods.

References 

Pycnodontiformes